The Catholic Church in the United Arab Emirates is part of the worldwide Catholic Church, under the spiritual leadership of the Pope in Rome.

There are nearly 1,000,000 expatriates in the UAE who are Catholics, representing around 11% of the total population, largely from the Philippines, India, South America, Lebanon, Africa, Germany, Italy, Ukraine, Portugal, Spain, France and other parts of Europe, Pakistan, Bangladesh and Sri Lanka. 

The UAE forms part of the Apostolic Vicariate of Southern Arabia. The seat of the vicariate is in St. Joseph's Cathedral, Abu Dhabi. The Vicar Apostolic Bishop is Paulo Martinelli.

Visit of Pope Francis to UAE
In June 2016, Pope Francis received and accepted an invitation to visit the UAE. On 6 December 2018, it was confirmed that the pope would visit the UAE to participate in the International Interfaith Meeting on "Human Fraternity" in Abu Dhabi.

On 3 February 2019, Pope Francis landed in Abu Dhabi and was greeted by Sheikh Mohammed bin Zayed Al Nahyan, Crown Prince of Abu Dhabi and Deputy Supreme Commander of the UAE Armed Forces and then Ahmad al-Tayyeb, Grand Imam of Al Azhar University, which serves as the lead source for Sunni Islam education and Chairman of the Muslim Council of Elders. The visit was the first papal visit to an area in the Arabian Peninsula. 

On 4 February, the Pope attended the Interfaith Meeting, during which he and Al-Tayyeb signed “A Document on Human Fraternity for World Peace and Living Together". The same day, the Pope spoke at the Abu Dhabi Founder's Memorial, held a meeting with Al-Tayyeb and other Muslim elders at the Sheikh Zayed Grand Mosque, and held a meeting with Crown Prince Sheikh Mohammed bin Zayed Al Nahyan at the Presidential Palace.

On 5 February 2019, Pope Francis concluded his trip after giving a mass in front of a large crowd, estimated at 180,000, at Zayed Sports City. Elements of the 90-minute service were conducted in Italian, English, Arabic, Tagalog, Urdu, Malayalam, Konkani and Korean. The Papal Mass was attended by nearly 20% of the estimated one million Catholics living and working in the UAE. The papal mass in Abu Dhabi was historic not only for being the first one in the Gulf region but also for the unique diversity of the participants.

Churches in the UAE
There are currently 9 Catholic churches in the UAE:

 St. Joseph's Cathedral, Abu Dhabi
 St. Mary's Catholic Church, Dubai
 St. Francis of Assisi Catholic Church, Jebel Ali
 St. Michael's Catholic Church, Sharjah
 St. Mary's Catholic Church, Al Ain
 St. Paul's Catholic Church, Musaffah
 St. Anthony of Padua Church,  Ras Al Khaimah
 Our Lady of Perpetual Help Catholic Church, Fujairah
 St. John the Baptist Catholic Church, Ruwais
 Sub Centres in Kalba, Khorfakkan, Dibba and Madinat Zayed.

See also
 Christianity in the United Arab Emirates
 Protestantism in the United Arab Emirates
 Apostolic Nunciature to United Arab Emirates

References

 
United Arab Emirates
United Arab Emirates
Apostolic Vicariate of Southern Arabia
Catholic Church in the Arabian Peninsula